

Mihai Viteazul National College is a high school located at 62 Pache Protopopescu Boulevard, Bucharest, Romania.

History

The school traces its origins to 1865, when Saint Sava National College was becoming overcrowded and two gymnasium classes were split off, marking the start of a separate institution. In 1867, Prince Carol decreed the establishment of Michael the Great Gymnasium, marking its legal beginning. For some 30 years, the school did not have its own building, moving around from place to place. It ultimately settled in the yard of the Lutheran Church. The students showed solidarity with the 1907 Romanian Peasants' Revolt. During the Central Powers’ occupation in World War I, the school was evacuated, its archive destroyed and classes suspended. Following the war, it was decided to construct a permanent building on land acquired by the Education Ministry in 1914.

The cornerstone was laid in 1921 and work on the main building was largely completed by 1928. It was used as a field hospital in World War II. In the early years of the communist regime, the 1937 auditorium burned down during a spontaneous student protest, which led to four students (including Sorin Bottez) being condemned to harsh prison sentences. The chapel on the upper floor became and remains a gymnastics room, although the high windows retain cross shapes. Eventually, the school was again moved, while the building housed a workers’ school. It returned as School nr. 13, and was again named after Michael the Brave in 1969. It was declared a national college in 1996. In 2011, by which time there were 1,200 students, the building underwent a thorough restoration.

The school building is listed as a historic monument by Romania's Ministry of Culture and Religious Affairs.

Alumni and faculty

Alumni

Bartolomeu Anania
Ion Barbu
Virgil I. Bărbat
Sorin Bottez
Radu Boureanu
Ana Caraiani
Cristofi Cerchez
Alexandru Claudian
A. de Herz
Édouard de Max
Horia Gârbea
Mircea Gesticone
Dimitrie Leonida
Nicolae Paulescu
Octav Șuluțiu
Șerban Țițeica
Dorin Tudoran
Mircea Vulcănescu
Ioan Matei Constantinescu

Faculty
Gheorghe Bogdan-Duică
Bonifaciu Florescu
Petre V. Haneș
Constantin Noe
George Potra
I. M. Rașcu
Octav Șuluțiu
Ștefan Zeletin

Notes

References
 Lucian Nastasă, "Suveranii" universităților românești. Mecanisme de selecție și promovare a elitei intelectuale. Cluj-Napoca, Editura Limes, 2007, 
 Aurel Sasu (ed.), Dicționarul biografic al literaturii române. Pitești: Editura Paralela 45, 2004.

External links

 Official site

High schools in Bucharest
Educational institutions established in 1865
1865 establishments in Romania
School buildings completed in 1928
National Colleges in Romania
Historic monuments in Bucharest